Rkia Mazrouai (born 11 May 2002) is a  footballer who plays as a right-back for Belgian Women's Super League club KAA Gent. Born in the Netherlands, she represented that nation as a youth but represents Morocco at full international level.

Early life
Rkia Mazrouai was born in Eindhoven.

Club career
Mazrouai is a PSV Eindhoven product. She is playing for Gent in Belgium.

Rkia Mazrouai was chosen first as Le Lion Belge 2022.

International career
Mazrouai made her senior debut for Morocco on 10 June 2021 as a 79th-minute substitution in a 3–0 friendly home win over Mali. Her first match as a starting player was four days later against the same opponent.

See also
List of Morocco women's international footballers

References

External links 

2002 births
Living people
Citizens of Morocco through descent
Moroccan women's footballers
Women's association football fullbacks
K.A.A. Gent (women) players
Morocco women's international footballers
Moroccan expatriate footballers
Moroccan expatriate sportspeople in Belgium
Expatriate women's footballers in Belgium
Footballers from Eindhoven
Dutch women's footballers
PSV (women) players
Dutch expatriate women's footballers
Dutch expatriate sportspeople in Belgium
Dutch sportspeople of Moroccan descent